Saphenista scalena is a species of moth of the family Tortricidae. It is found in Carchi Province, Ecuador.

The wingspan is about 14 mm. The ground colour of the forewings is cream, but white in the distal third of the wing. The suffusions are pale brownish yellow and the markings are brown yellow. The hindwings are whitish, but cream at the apex.

Etymology
The species name refers to the markings of the forewings and is derived from Latin scalena (meaning a kind of triangle).

References

Moths described in 2007
Saphenista